The 2018 season was the Oakland Raiders' 49th in the National Football League, their 59th overall, their 24th since their return to Oakland, and their first under head coach Jon Gruden since his rehiring by the organization (fifth overall). The Raiders finished the season with a 4–12 record, failing to improve upon their previous season's record of 6–10, and their worst since 2014.

With a loss to the Kansas City Chiefs in Week 13, the Raiders were eliminated from playoff contention for the second consecutive season. With their week 15 loss to the Bengals, the Raiders failed to improve their record from the previous season. The loss also secured their spot at last in the AFC West.

On December 10, the Raiders fired general manager Reggie McKenzie who had been with the Raiders since 2012.

As of 2023, the only remaining members of the 2018 Oakland Raiders still Raiders are Kolton Miller, Daniel Carlson, and Trent Sieg.

Stadium issues
Although the league approved the Raiders' eventual relocation to Las Vegas on March 27, 2017, the team maintained its lease at the Oakland–Alameda County Coliseum and used the stadium for the 2018 season while the team's new stadium in Las Vegas was under construction. Initially in April 2017, the operators of the Coliseum stated they would be unwilling to sign a lease extension for the team to play at the stadium while their new venue in Las Vegas was being built; however by September of that year, the Coliseum operators expressed willingness to negotiate, but insisted on concessions to compensate for the million-dollar deficit the Coliseum runs by hosting Raiders games. Owner Mark Davis stated he preferred to stay in Oakland for the 2019 season but was considering other options, including Las Vegas's Sam Boyd Stadium, Berkeley's California Memorial Stadium, Mackay Stadium in Reno, Nevada; the San Francisco 49ers's Levi's Stadium and even the Alamodome in San Antonio, Texas, a venue thought to have been ruled out in 2014. Davis acknowledged that if fans failed to support the team similarly to the 1996 Houston Oilers, it could hasten the relocation. Team management also indicated they would relocate after 2018 if there were any lawsuits filed against the team; the city of Oakland sued the Raiders and all other teams in the league on December 11, 2018, however the Raiders remained in Oakland for the final year despite the lawsuit.

Offseason

Coaching changes
On January 6, 2018, the Raiders hired their former head coach, Jon Gruden, who returned to the Raiders and coaching from ESPN's Monday Night Football. Gruden received a 10-year, $100-million contract to return to the Raiders. Gruden last coached in the NFL in 2008 with the Tampa Bay Buccaneers and last coached the Raiders in 2001. At the press conference announcing the hiring of Gruden on January 9, Gruden announced that Los Angeles Rams quarterbacks coach Greg Olson had been hired as offensive coordinator, though Gruden would call plays, while former Cincinnati Bengals defensive coordinator Paul Guenther was hired as the new defensive coordinator. Gruden also announced that former Tampa Bay Buccaneers and Dallas Cowboys special teams coordinator Rich Bisaccia was hired to serve as special teams coordinator. On January 29, the Raiders named Brian Callahan, son of their former head coach Bill Callahan, as the new quarterbacks coach.

Khalil Mack holdout and trade to Chicago
On September 1, 2018, the Raiders traded defensive star Khalil Mack along with their 2020 2nd round pick to the Chicago Bears for two first round picks (RB Josh Jacobs and CB Damon Arnette), a 2019 6th round pick, and a 2020 3rd round pick, after he had held out of training camp.

Free agent signings

Losses

Trades

Draft

Notes

 The Raiders finished with the same overall record and strength of schedule as the San Francisco 49ers at the end of the  season, and their selecting order was determined by way of a coin flip at the NFL Scouting Combine in March 2018; the Raiders lost the coin toss and received the 10th selection. Both teams rotated with the Miami Dolphins, receiving the 9th, 10th and 11th pick in each round.

Draft trades

The Raiders traded their fifth-round selection (146th overall, S Tre Flowers) to Seattle in exchange for Seattle's sixth-round selection (192nd overall, T Jamil Demby) and running back Marshawn Lynch.
The Raiders traded a sixth-round selection (210th overall, WR Braxton Berrios) and wide receiver Cordarrelle Patterson to New England in exchange for Kansas City's fifth-round selection (159th overall, WR Daurice Fountain).
The Raiders traded a sixth-round selection (192nd overall, T Jamil Demby) and fullback Jamize Olawale to Dallas in exchange for Dallas's fifth-round selection (173rd overall, P Johnny Townsend).
The Raiders were awarded four sixth-round compensatory picks (210th, 212th, 216th and 217th overall).

Undrafted free agent signings

Marcus Baugh, TE, Ohio State, released at the end of training camp.
Saeed Blacknall, WR, Penn State, waived and made the practice squad.
Jason Cabinda, LB, Penn State, released at the end of training camp.
Alex Officer, C, Pittsburgh, released on May 17.
Eddy Piñeiro, K, Florida, placed on injured reserve at the end of training camp.
Nick Sharga, FB, Temple, released on May 7.

Source

Staff

Final roster

Preseason
The Raiders' preseason opponents and schedule were released on April 11.

Regular season

Schedule and results
On January 11, the NFL announced that the Raiders will play host to the Seattle Seahawks in a London Game in London, England. The game site, originally slated for Tottenham Hotspur Stadium, was later moved to Wembley Stadium. This marked the fourth time in five seasons in which the Raiders played a game outside the United States, as well as their second visit to London (the other being 2014).

Note: Intra-division opponents are in bold text

Game summaries

Week 1: vs. Los Angeles Rams
During the game, tight end Jared Cook set a new franchise record for most receiving yards in a game by a Raiders tight end finishing the night with 180 yards on nine catches. The previous record was held by Todd Christensen with 173 yards on November 20, 1986 against the San Diego Chargers. He was one of only six tight ends to ever record over 180 yards receiving since 1999. Quarterback Derek Carr threw three interceptions in a game for his second time in his career, the previous time was against the Kansas City Chiefs in 2015.

Week 2: at Denver Broncos

Week 3: at Miami Dolphins

Week 4: vs. Cleveland Browns

Week 5: at Los Angeles Chargers

Week 6: vs. Seattle Seahawks
NFL London Games

Week 8: vs. Indianapolis Colts

This game was the first game for the Raiders without wide receiver Amari Cooper, as the Dallas Cowboys traded their 2019 1st round draft pick in exchange for Cooper the week before the game.

Week 9: at San Francisco 49ers

Week 10: vs. Los Angeles Chargers

Week 11: at Arizona Cardinals

Week 12: at Baltimore Ravens

Week 13: vs. Kansas City Chiefs

Week 14: vs. Pittsburgh Steelers

Week 15: at Cincinnati Bengals

Week 16: vs. Denver Broncos

Week 17: at Kansas City Chiefs

Standings

Division

Conference

References

External links
 

Oakland
Oakland Raiders seasons
Oakland Raiders
2010s in Oakland, California